I Must Abandon You (Spanish: Tengo que abandonarte) is a 1969 Spanish film directed by Antonio del Amo.

Cast
 Tomás Blanco 
 Ana María Mendoza 
 Gisia Paradís 
 Esther Riera 
 Maribel Sáez 
 Jaime Toja 
 Juan Trenchs

References

Bibliography 
 de España, Rafael. Directory of Spanish and Portuguese film-makers and films. Greenwood Press, 1994.

External links 
 

1969 films
Spanish romantic drama films
1960s Spanish-language films
Films directed by Antonio del Amo
1960s Spanish films